Dolphin Air was a charter airline based in Dubai, United Arab Emirates. It operated charter services within the Middle East and Pakistan. Its main base was Dubai International Airport.

History 
The airline started operations in 2002.It was a charter airline based in Dubai that was founded in 1996 as Santa Cruz Imperial Airlines in Liberia, acquired later by Flying Dolphin Airlines and relocated.  It was reorganised by Arabian Devt Trading and Construction, taking over assets from Santa Cruz Imperial. It had 68 employees (at March 2007).

Fleet 
The Dolphin Air fleet consisted of the following aircraft:
2 Boeing 737-200

References

External links
 Official website

Defunct airlines of the United Arab Emirates
Airlines established in 1996
Airlines disestablished in 2008
Emirati companies established in 1996